A constitutional referendum was held in Ivory Coast on 23 and 24 July 2000. The changes to the constitution would require both parents of presidential candidates to have been born in the country, as well as giving immunity from prosecution from those involved in the coup the previous year. It was approved by 86.53% of voters with a 56% turnout.

The changes barred Rally of the Republicans leader Alassane Ouattara from standing in the presidential elections, and was one of the catalysts for the Ivorian Civil War.

Results

References

2000 referendums
2000 in Ivory Coast
Referendums in Ivory Coast
Constitutional referendums